No. 223 Squadron  (Tridents) is a fighter squadron and is equipped with MiG-29UPG and based at srinagar AFS.

History
223 Squadron IAF was formed on 10 May 1982. It was the first Squadron in the IAF to be equipped with MiG-23 MF. The Squadron had the unique distinction of operating MiG-23s from Leh airport one of the highest airfields a fighter has ever operated from. The Squadron was christened The Swing Wing Interceptors  in accordance with the aircraft it operated then.

In May 1989, the phasing out of MiG-23s started. Induction of the MiG-29s commenced in early 1990 and within a few months the Squadron had its full complement of aircraft and was fully operational. Since the swing wing was no more applicable the Squadron changed its nickname to Tridents.

The squadron's crest shows the striking end of "Trident". As per Indian history, this three pronged weapon, is Lord Shiva's powerful weapon. He is also known as the God of destruction.

Aircraft

References

223